Altarnun is a village and civil parish in Cornwall, England, United Kingdom.

The parish of Altarnun includes the village of Fivelanes and the hamlets of Bolventor, Treween and Trewint, and had a population of 976 according to the 2001 census. This increased to 1,084 according to the 2011 census. Other hamlets in the parish are Bowithick, Palmersbridge, South Carne, Tolborough, Lower Tregunnon and Tredaule. By the time of the 2011 census the figures for the ward of Altarnun were provided. This ward contained 48 locations in the area and gave a population of 4,038.

The moorland area of the parish is large and lies west of the village towards Rough Tor and southwards towards Dozmary Pool. There is a large conifer plantation at Wilsey Down Forest (Halvana Plantation). The village is in the valley of the Penpont Water and the parish is divided by the A30 trunk road which passes through Fivelanes which was once an important stopping place for stage coaches.

Church history

A Norman church was built in Altarnun in the 12th century, but the present church was built in the 15th century from unquarried stone (moorstone) from Bodmin Moor. The church is dedicated to St Nonna, mother of St David. A Celtic cross from the time of St Nonna is located by the church gate. This cross consists of a cross head resting on a stone base. Another cross is located at Two-gates by the road about half a mile (0.8 km) north of the church; it is locally known as "Short Cross" and is probably a fragment of what was once a taller stone. Other crosses are known as Sanctuary Cross, Halvana Cross, Occasiney Cross, Trekennick Cross, Tresmeak Cross and St Vincent's Mine Cross.

As the largest parish church on Bodmin Moor, the Church of St Nonna is known as the Cathedral of the Moor. It is notable for a fine Norman font and old woodwork, including the screen, bench-ends and communion rails which date to 1684. The screen is one of the finest 15th-century examples in Cornwall; it has three gates and the cornice of vines and tracery and vaulting are finely carved.

John Wesley often visited Trewint, lodging in Digory Isbell's home which is now a museum of Wesley and Methodism. (The former Altarnun Wesleyan chapel has the head of Wesley carved over the doorway by Neville Northey Burnard. This was done when Burnard was aged sixteen years and lived next door.)

Language and culture
Altarnun features in the novel Jamaica Inn by Daphne du Maurier set in the parish's former coaching house by the same name. The village was also the birthplace of sculptor Neville Northey Burnard (1818–1878). It was surveyed for the Survey of English Dialects.

Notable people
British bryologist Frances Elizabeth Tripp grew up in Altarnun, since her father was vicar.

See also

Cornish bagpipes
Gueltas, a Breton commune twinned with Altarnun

References

Further reading
Shaw, Thomas (1960) Trewint in its Historical Setting

External links

Altarnun Pipes
Genuki: Altarnun

Civil parishes in Cornwall
Villages in Cornwall
Bodmin Moor